This is a list of Unitarian, Universalist, and Unitarian Universalist churches.  Various congregations (churches, societies, fellowships, etc.) and/or individual churches as buildings, of these related religious groups have historic or other significance.

Numerous Unitarian churches are notable for having historic buildings, and there are former church buildings that are historic as well.  There are numerous Unitarian churches that are listed buildings in England, that are listed on the National Register of Historic Places in the United States, or that are noted on other historic registers.

This article includes churches notable either as congregations or as buildings or as both.

Australia

Canada
This is a list intended to cover notable Canadian Unitarian Universalist (UU) churches as either congregations or as buildings or as both. UU congregations in Canada are members of the Canadian Unitarian Council (CUC). The CUC is made up of 46 member congregations and emerging groups.

India
Indian Council of Unitarian Churches —ICUU
Khasi Unitarian Union: 9,000 members
The Unitarian Christian Church of Chennai

Indonesia
Jemaat Allah Global Indonesia (JAGI), internationally known as Unitarian Christian Church of Indonesia (UCCI), was founded in 1998 and formally registered in 2000, headquarter in Semarang, Java, includes several congregations, member of ICUU. For the church are observed some Law of Moses practices, such as dietary laws and seventh-day Sabbath.

Ireland
Unitarian Church in Ireland, consisting of two churches, part of the Non-subscribing Presbyterian Church of Ireland.

Philippines

The Unitarian Universalist Church of the Philippines, Inc.
Status:	Full Member
Members:	2000
Ministers:	34
Founded:	The Universalist Church of the Philippines was started in 1954 by Rev. Toribio S. Quimada (d. 1988; martyred). In 1954, the Church was affiliated with the Universalist Church of America. In 1988, UUCP was admitted as a member congregation of the UUA. In 1995, UUCP was one of the founding churches of the ICUU.
Congregations:	30

Romania
The Unitarian Church of Transylvania includes a number of individual churches, several with notable historic murals.

South Africa
The Unitarian Community of Cape Town is the founding site for Unitarianism in South Africa, started in 1867 by Rev. Dawid Faure. It is a welcoming congregation.

United Kingdom

The General Assembly of Unitarian and Free Christian Churches counts about 180 churches as members. The following have articles on Wikipedia:

 Billingshurst Unitarian Chapel, West Sussex (1754)
 Brighton Unitarian Church, 1820, built by Amon Henry Wilds
 Chowbent Chapel, Atherton, Greater Manchester, England. Building dates from 1721.  Building designated a Grade II* Listed building in 1966.
Cross Street Chapel, Manchester. The Dissenters' Meeting House was opened in 1694 and holds a special place in the growth of nonconformism within the city.  It became a Unitarian meeting-house c.1761. It was wrecked by a Jacobite mob in 1715, rebuilt and destroyed during a World War II air raid in December 1940. A new building was constructed in 1959 and the present structure dates from 1997
 Ditchling Unitarian Chapel, East Sussex ( 1730)
Essex Church, the first Unitarian church in England, moved in 1880s from central London to Kensington
 Horsham Unitarian Church, West Sussex (1719)
Newington Green Unitarian Church, north London
Octagon Chapel, Norwich
Richmond & Putney Unitarian Church, Richmond, London, dating from 1896
Rivington Unitarian Chapel, near Manchester
 Todmorden Unitarian Church, in Yorkshire
 Underbank Chapel, in Sheffield
 Unitarian Chapel, Liverpool
 Upper Chapel, in Sheffield

United States
This is a list intended to cover notable churches, including many that are listed on the U.S. National Register of Historic Places.

(by state then city)

Worldwide
Church of the Larger Fellowship (CLF) is a worldwide congregation.
International Council of Unitarians and Universalists (ICUU) is an umbrella organization founded in 1995 bringing together many Unitarians, Universalists, and Unitarian Universalists.

See also
List of Unitarians, Universalists, and Unitarian Universalists

References

 
Unitarian